Goetzea is a genus of plant in the family Solanaceae. It was originally placed by H. Wydler in the family Ebenaceae and named for his teacher the Rev. Johann August Ephraim Goetze.
It was for about half a century included in the now defunct family Goetzeaceae Miers ex Airy Shaw

Note

This is not to be confused with Goetzea, Rchb., a genus in the 
Fabaceaea, the bean family

Species

 Goetzea amoena Griseb. 
 Goetzea eggersii Urban ex Radlk. 
 Goetzea ekmanii O.E.Schulz ex O.C.Schmidt
 Goetzea elegans Wydler

Notes

References

External links

 MOBOT Tropicos
 ITIS

 
Solanaceae genera
Taxonomy articles created by Polbot